Michael Steinberg may refer to:

Michael Steinberg (music critic) (1928–2009), American music critic and musicologist
Michael Steinberg (film-maker) (born 1959), American film director and producer
Michael Steinberg (lawyer) (born 1959), lawyer and political candidate in Florida who ran against J. W. Grant
Michael P. Steinberg, professor of history, and of music and German studies